John Balet (fl. 1380s), of Reading, Berkshire, was an English politician and brewer. He was a Member (MP) of the Parliament of England for Reading in April 1384 and September 1388.

References

Year of birth missing
Year of death missing
English MPs April 1384
14th-century English politicians
People from Reading, Berkshire
English MPs September 1388